The Tandil Open was a golf tournament on the TPG Tour, the official professional golf tour in Argentina. First held in 2006, it was always held at the Valle de Tandil Golf Club, in Tandil, Buenos Aires Province.

Winners

PO – won following playoff

External links
TPG Tour – official site

Golf tournaments in Argentina